Arthur William Bluck OBE (6 March 1864 – June 1944) was a Bermudan judge and politician who served as a member of the House of Assembly and Speaker of the Colonial Parliament of Bermuda between 1929 and 1933. He also served as an Assistant Justice of the Supreme Court of Bermuda and Mayor of Hamilton in 1932.

References 

1864 births
1944 deaths
Officers of the Order of the British Empire
Mayors of Hamilton, Bermuda
Members of the House of Assembly of Bermuda
People from Hamilton, Bermuda